The Harvard University Advanced Leadership Initiative's goal is to assist experienced leaders who want to solve important social problems in the next stage of their professional lives.  A key part of this assistance is providing an opportunity for the selected participants to spend one year in an intensive structured program at Harvard as Advanced Leadership Initiative Fellows.  Faculty leadership for this initiative  include Harvard Professors Rosabeth Moss Kanter, Rakesh Khurana, Fernando Reimers, Howard Koh, David Gergen, Barry Bloom, William George, Charles Ogletree, and Nitin Nohria. The program was founded in January 2009.

Advanced Leadership Initiative Fellows

Advanced Leadership Initiative Fellows  have included:

Laurent Adamowicz-  founder and president of the public charity Eradicate Childhood Obesity Foundation
J. Veronica Biggins – former Director of Presidential Personnel for President Bill Clinton
Anna Burger – former Secretary-Treasurer of the Service Employees International Union
James A. Champy – Chairman Emeritus of Dell Services Consulting
Michael Critelli – CEO of Dossia and former Executive Chairman of Pitney Bowes
Gilberto Dimenstein – Columnist at the Brazilian newspaper Folha de S.Paulo
John D. Gardner - retired United States Army lieutenant general and former commander of the United States Army South
Philip I. Kent - American media executive. Former chief executive officer of Turner Broadcasting System Inc.
Susan Leal – a water utility consultant, and the co-author of the book Running out of Water. Formerly, general manager of the San Francisco Public Utilities Commission, a San Francisco Treasurer and a San Francisco Supervisor.
Thuli Madonsela - former public protector of South Africa 
Iyabo Obasanjo-Bello former Nigerian Senator, and daughter of former President of Nigeria Olusegun Obasanjo
Gale Pollock – retired United States Army major general who served as the Deputy Surgeon General of the United States Army, and also as chief of the Army Nurse Corps
Rodney Slater – former U.S. Secretary of Transportation in the Clinton Administration
 Jennifer M. Smith - former premier of Bermuda from 1998 until 2003
 Gillian Sorensen - former Assistant Secretary-General of the United Nations and former Senior Advisor and National Advocate at the United Nations Foundation
 Jeffrey W. Talley -  retired United States Army lieutenant general. The 32nd Chief of Army Reserve (CAR) and 7th commanding general, United States Army Reserve Command (USARC).
 Reyes Tamez - a Mexican immunochemist and former president of the Autonomous University of Nuevo León (UANL) and also former secretary of education in the cabinet of Vicente Fox (2000–2006).

References

Further reading
Are Golden Years a Golden Opportunity to Innovate?, Bloomberg; May 30, 2013
Rebecca Knight, Interview: Rosabeth Moss Kanter, Financial Times; May 12, 2013
Unlikely Crusader, Saving One Girl at a Time, Singapore American; March 1, 2013
Africa Atlantic to set up a pioneering agribusiness knowledge center in Ghana, HARVARD UNIVERSITY; Feb 26, 2013
Jenna Russell and Jenn Abelson, Putting expired foods to healthy use, The Boston Globe; Feb 26, 2013
Warren Bennis, Harvard's Advanced Leadership Initiative, Business Week; October 29, 2012
Glenn Ruffenach, Tools to Help the World, Wall Street Journal; May 30, 2012
Becoming An Advanced Leader (Audio), The Economist; December 28, 2010

Harvard University